The 1929–30 Marquette Hilltoppers men's ice hockey season was the 8th season of play for the program.

Season
After coming up short the previous year, Marquette did not shy away from a challenge and put together the toughest schedule the team had yet undertaken. The Hilltoppers began with a tour of northern Michigan and Minnesota, playing two junior colleges during that time (they were members of the NIHA so the games counted in league standings). The team got a hard fight in the second half of their road trip but managed to hand Virginia Junior College its first loss of the season, having been 5–0 coming into the game. When the team returned home they took on Janesville A.C. and coach Iverson gave increased playing time to some of the newer player. Furlong and Moore responded with good performances, meaning that the team may be able to stay in the upper echelon of their division after the Two Macs graduated. In the drubbing of Janesville, despite not starting the match, MacKenzie and McFadyen each scored four goals.

With the team having steeled back in Milwaukee, they welcomed in Minnesota for a tough series. The team pulled out a narrow win in the first game but the second was delayed for a day due to soft ice. After a cold night the teams finished off the series with Marquette laying into the Gophers with a 5–1 victory. The win not only had the Hilltoppers atop the league standings, but gave Minnesota their fourth consecutive loss and fifth overall, meaning it would be impossible for the Gophers to challenge for the Intercollegiate title this season. Marquette finished up their home schedule with a pair of wins while Moore and Furlong both continued to show improvement.

The Hilltoppers hit the road for the remainder of the season. First the team stopped off in Ann Arbor at the end of January but could only manage a split against the Wolverines. This was the first win for Michigan over Marquette but with the Hilltoppers' lead in the standings they could absorb the loss. A few days later the team met Harvard, playing an eastern team for the first time in program history, and produced a surprising result. The Blue and Gold played a nearly perfect game, coming away with a victory over the perennial power (who were in contention for the eastern crown themselves) "Porky" Furlong had his best game to date, scoring twice to push Marquette over the top and leaving little doubt that the western clubs deserved to be on equal footing with the traditional powers of the east. After downing Army, Marquette took on the best team in the nation and produced one of the most memorable games in the history of the program. Yale entered the game 12–0 and Marquette set about trying to dent the Bulldogs for the first time on the year. Owing to the skill of the Elis, Marquette used three defensive players at a time rather than the standard two, this was caused as much by Yale's offense as the fact that no one on the team could keep up with McFadyen and MacKenzie when the Macs were skating at full tilt. The plan did not seem to work at the start as Yale came away with a 2–0 lead after the first period. Marquette began to climb back in the second; the Macs alternated goals with Yale and cut the lead to one at the start of the third. The two teams fought hard but Marquette's long road trip began to wear on the team and Yale scored its fifth goal with less than four minutes to play. The Hilltoppers knew they were swamped; the Elis surged in the final few minutes, scoring three more times before the clock read '0' and turning a very tight game into a rout.

Even with the loss to Yale, Marquette had acquitted themselves well against the east and took a few weeks off before their final series with Minnesota. When the two met at the beginning of March, Marquette was so far ahead in the standings that they had already sewn up the western championship but the two were not going to let that stop them, the teams still had a great deal of pride. The Hilltoppers split the series with the Gophers, ensuring that they had a winning record against all major competition and earned their second league championship in three seasons. The games would be the last two coached between the brothers Iverson as Emil, the Minnesota coach, had announced his resignation in February. After the season, Kay following his brother's example and resigned as the Hilltoppers' bench boss. The loss compounded the difficulties that were sure to result from losing MacKenzie and McFadyen to graduation but, unfortunately, worse was to come for the Blue and Gold as circumstances beyond their control would soon threaten the existence of the program.

Roster

Standings

Schedule and results

|-
!colspan=12 style=";" | Regular Season

† Michigan Tech records the game as being played in Milwaukee.

References

Marquette Golden Eagles men's ice hockey seasons
Marquette
Marquette
Marquette
Marquette